Christa Gannon was the female winner of the 1994 Walter Byers Award, the National Collegiate Athletic Association's highest academic honor, in recognition of being the nation's top female scholar-athlete.  She graduated with honors from the University of California at Santa Barbara. Following graduation, she went to law school, first at Northwestern University School of Law before transferring to Stanford Law School where she graduated in 1997.  After law school she won a George Soros fellowship for postgraduate study.

Notes

American women's basketball players
American lawyers
Living people
UC Santa Barbara Gauchos women's basketball players
Stanford Law School alumni
Year of birth missing (living people)
American women lawyers
21st-century American women